Marcus Riley (born April 14, 1985) is a former American football linebacker. He was signed by the Green Bay Packers as an undrafted free agent in 2008. He played college football at Fresno State.

Riley has also been a member of the St. Louis Rams and Chicago Bears.

Personal
Riley is a cousin of former NFL wide receiver Henry Ellard.

External links
Chicago Bears bio
Fresno State Bulldogs bio

1985 births
Living people
Players of American football from Sacramento, California
American football linebackers
Fresno State Bulldogs football players
Green Bay Packers players
St. Louis Rams players
Chicago Bears players
Las Vegas Locomotives players